Beryl Randle (born 16 December 1928) is a former race walker and an athletics administrator. She raced for Birchfield Harriers.

She took up competitive walking in 1946, after coming last in a 100-metre sprint, and was coached by Doris Nelson Neal. To train, she would walk from her home in Walsall to her workplace in Digbeth, Birmingham, and back -  each day.

On 29 May 1954, she broke the world record for the one-mile walk, with a time of 7 minutes 49 seconds. On 19 June 1954, she shaved over ten seconds from her own record, at the White City Stadium, with a time of 7 minutes 38.4 seconds. In doing so, she became the Women's Amateur Athletic Association Champion. She was honoured for this achievement with a brooch depicting the stag logo of Birchfield Harriers in solid gold, commissioned by G.H. Alexander, then president of the club. She later said:

Randle is a six-time Midland mile track champion, four-time British mile track champion, and three-time Midland road-walking champion.

After winning £1,000 for coming in second in a 1960 John O'Groats–Land's End walk sponsored by Billy Butlin – she lost the lead to Wendy Lewis after twisting her ankle – she had to relinquish her amateur status, though it was later restored, and she resumed competing. During the 1980s, she coached Birchfield Harriers' girls' teams.

At the age of 71, she broke the over-70s age group world record for the 3000-metres walk.

She was Honorary General Secretary of the Race Walking Association from 1988 to 1991, and its President from 1996 to 1998. She was subsequently made an Honorary Life Member, and was given their lifetime achievement award in 2014.

In 2009, she was elected President of the Midland Counties Athletics Association.

References 

1928 births
Living people
Birchfield Harriers
English female racewalkers
Sportspeople from Walsall
World record setters in athletics (track and field)
World record holders in masters athletics
British female racewalkers